Ernst-August Künnecke (born 3 January 1938 – March 16, 2002) was a German football player and football coach.

Football career
Künnecke played his youth football with Hannover 96. He advanced and played at amateur level. In 1960 he became amateur champion with Hannover 96. Künnecke remained amateur, but his playing career did not last long. He moved to VfV Hildesheim and later to SV Arminia Hannover, before returning to Hannover 96.

In 1967 Künnecke started his coaching career with SC Tuttlingen, a small amateur club in the south of the Black Forest. In 1969 he signed as head coach for Patro Eisden in Belgium. Afterwards, Künnecke moved to second division Racing Mechelen and won the title and were promoted in the 1974–75 season, but were relegated a year later. He was also head coach for VfR Heilbronn, KFC Winterslag, Lierse S.K. and Waterschei Thor.

Künnecke joined Basel's first team for their 1983–84 season and signed a two-year contract. His reputation grew because of his conveyance, his advancing and his greatest strength was the furtherance of young players. As the season advanced it became increasingly apparent that Künnecke's ideas were not reaching the entire team squad at all times. Basel's youngsters played well during this season, Fredy Grossenbacher, Martin Jeitziner, Peter Nadig, Thomas Hauser and Beat Sutter advanced well under Künnecke. But Künnecke's ideas were not being accepted by the older, experienced players. At home, in the St. Jakob Stadium the team was playing well and winning the games, the first five home games were all won. However, the first seven away games all ended with a defeat. After the winter break Basel lost their first home game against La Chaux-de-Fonds 0–1. Künnecke reacted immediately and this was the last game that the three veterans Arthur von Wartburg, Jörg Stohler and Jean-Pierre Maradan played in the team. The supporters had noted the differences and the final home game of the season attracted only 2,000 spectators. The following season Basel lost three of their first four matches. Then, following a run of five defeats and five draws with only one win, the team suffered one defeat too many against Lausanne-Sport on the 11 November, and Basel's club chairman Urs Gribi fired Künnecke.

Following two seasons with K.V. Mechelen and another with  K.R.C. Genk, Künnecke was contacted by Basel's new chairman Charles Röthlisberger. In the meantime, Basel had suffered relegation, Röthlisberger had sacked Urs Siegenthaler and then he re-installed Künnecke as head coach. Künnecke settled in Switzerland and stayed with the club nearly three years, until in March 1992 chairman Röthlisberger released him from his position, due to a run of poor results.

One year as head coach with TuS Celle, two years with Brühl St. Gallen, then a short period with Dynamo Dresden as youth manager, then one season as head coach for Kreuzlingen was Künnecke’s final stations while he lived in Switzerland. In 1998 he returned to Belgium and became the coach of third division team Rita Berlaar. Künnecke suffered from a lingering illness and died in March 2002 from the effects of that illness.

References

Sources
 Rotblau: Jahrbuch Saison 2017/2018. Publisher: FC Basel Marketing AG. 
 Die ersten 125 Jahre. Publisher: Josef Zindel im Friedrich Reinhardt Verlag, Basel. 
 Ernst-August Künnecke at Verein "Basler Fussballarchiv" site 

German football managers
German expatriate football managers
FC Basel managers 
K.V. Mechelen managers
K. Patro Eisden Maasmechelen managers
K.R.C. Mechelen managers
German footballers
Association football midfielders
1938 births
2002 deaths
Hannover 96 players
SV Arminia Hannover players
Lierse S.K. managers
K.R.C. Genk managers